Jagannath Temple is dedicated to the Hindu god Jagannath, his brother Balabhadra, and sister Subhadra. The temple is located on Sarjapur Road in Agara in Bangalore, Karnataka, India. Its main festival is the annual Rath Yatra, which sees more than fifteen thousand devotees. The temple is maintained by the Shree Jagannath Temple Trust of Bangalore.

The temple is open from 6:00 AM to 12:00 PM and 4:00 PM to 9:00 PM.

Other Jagannath Temples In Bangalore
Sri Jagannath Mandir, Seshadripuram
Sri Jagannath Mandir, South Bangalore

References

Hindu temples in Bangalore
Temples dedicated to Jagannath